La Bataille de la Moscowa is a board wargame published originally by Martial Enterprises in 1975, later republished by Game Designers Workshop in 1977, and by Clash of Arms in 2011.

Gameplay

La Bataille de la Moscowa is a wargame that simulates the Battle of Borodino during Napoleon's invasion of Russia.

The game introduced the concept of "limited intelligence": Only unit identification and movement allowance are printed on the face-up side of each counter, while all other combat information is printed on the reverse. Thus an opponent only has a vague idea of the capabilities of a unit when it first is placed on the map. It is only when the unit is engaged in combat that it is flipped over to reveal its true strength (or weakness).

Components
22-page rulebook (16 pages of scenarios)
1440 counters
 four 28" x 22" paper hex grid maps scaled at 100 m (109 yd) per hex

Development and publication history
La Bataille de la Moscowa was originally designed by Laurence A. Groves and published by Martial Enterprises in 1975. (The company changed its name to Marshall Enterprises shortly after the game was published.) The game was originally released as a "baggy game" (everything enclosed in a plastic bag rather than a box), and included six short scenarios and a grand battle game.

Scaled to the regimental/battalion level — each hex is 100 metres, and each turn is 20 minutes of game time — the game utilizes four maps and 1400 counters representing various military units, making it one of the biggest and most complex wargames published at the time. In the essay "A Game Out of All Proportion", Jon Peterson commented that "The market's sweet tooth for fantasy in the 1970s did not spoil its appetite for historical simulation entirely. Traditional wargames in this period grew in both depth and breadth, though not simultaneously in the same product. The small unit actions depicted by Tactical Game 3 inspired a number of narrow-scale successors [...] Simultaneously, other titles tried to capture the campaign-level activities of major battle theatres [...] there followed many of these so-called "monster games," such as the 1,400-counter juggernaut of Marshall Enterprises, La Bataille de la Moscowa (1975) [...] These games tested the limits of what could practically be modelled on a physical apparatus." 

In 1977, GDW bought the rights to the game and republished it as a boxed set with upgraded components and minor rules revisions. 

Marshall Enterprises continued to produce games in the "Bataille" series: 
 La Bataille de Auerstaedt (1977)
 La Bataille de Pruessisch-Eylau (1978)
 La Bataille d'Espagnol: Talavera (1979)
 La Bataille de Austerlitz (1980) 
 La Bataille de Deutsch-Wagram

In 1984, Clash of Arms bought the rights to the entire series; they re-released Bataille de la Moscowa (3rd Edition) in 2011.

Reception
In a 1976 poll undertaken by wargame publisher SPI to determine the most popular board wargame, La Bataille de la Moscowa was voted the best amateur game, and was the second-most popular game.

In his 1977 book The Comprehensive Guide to Board Wargaming, Nicholas Palmer called this game "quite out of the ordinary." He noted the "detailed rules with an emphasis on tactical accuracy," but warned that games were "Very long indeed (40 hours plus.)" He concluded by characterizing the game as "satisfying" but "Very complex." In his 1980 sequel, The Best of Board Wargaming, Palmer called the second edition "one of the most beautiful sights in wargaming: four maps in four colours, six counter sheets in five more colours [...] and two full colour, order-of-battle sheets." He concluded, "Most players mad enough to want all the detail of the game will probably also be mad enough to play the full battle game sooner or later, and certainly this offers maximum scope for both strategy and tactical ingenuity."

In the 1981 edition of The Wargamer, (Vol.1 No. 15), Charles Vasey found the complexity of the game admirable, although he had minor disagreements with a few of the morale rules. Vasey also disagreed with some aspects of the makeup of the armies, complaining that the game makes Russian Jaeger units and Russian cavalry inferior to their French opponents when Vasey claimed history showed the opposite. Despite these problems, he recommended the game, saying, "it's colourful, it's big, it's exciting, it's full of flavour."

In Issue 53 of Moves, Ian Chadwick commented that "While not an overly complex game to learn, it does take a long time to play and it takes a while to familiarize players with the intricacies of the tactical game." He liked the unique "limited intelligence" rule, and also admired "A particular lack of rules constraints", noting that there were no restrictions on the mobility or attack capability of units. His two dislikes were too much white space on the maps, making them hard to look at during long games; and no rules about unit formations, despite a long tradition in Napoleonic wargames to define how units are presented. Despite these problems, he concluded by giving it a "B" for playability, an "A" for historical accuracy, and a "B" for component quality, saying, "A delight and a must in the collection of Napoleonic and tactical buffs."

In The Guide to Simulations/Games for Education and Training, Martin Campion called this "one of the best of the monster games." With regards to using it in the classroom, Campion wrote, "It allows the study of a major battle at close range. The availability of short scenarios and rules for groups is a boon for a teacher. The game is big, but the rules are not particularly hard."

Awards
At the 1976 Origins Awards, La Bataille de la Moscowa won the Charles S. Roberts Award for Best Amateur Game of 1975.

Reviews
Games & Puzzles #62

References

Clash of Arms games
Game Designers' Workshop games
Napoleonic Wars board wargames
Origins Award winners
Wargames introduced in 1975